Kannoth Karunakaran (5 July 1918 – 23 December 2010) was an Indian politician who served as the 5th Chief Minister of Kerala in 1977, from 1981 to March 1982, from May 1982 to 1987 and again from 1991 to 1995. He is the founder of the United Democratic Front (UDF) coalition, which is the current political alliance in Kerala led by INC.

K. Karunakaran was close to former prime ministers Indira Gandhi and Rajiv Gandhi. At the helm of his career in the 1980s and 1990s, he enjoyed considerable access, confidence and control at All India Congress Committee to a point that he had an important role in helping P. V. Narasimha Rao become the Prime Minister of India. He played a crucial role in nurturing and strengthening INC into a strong political party in Kerala and enjoyed mass support of not just the party workers but the entire anti-communist solidarity that was active in Kerala. He is also credited with bringing development in multiple sectors in Kerala by spearheading key projects. The Kochi airport, the country’s first international airport in the private sector, the Rajiv Gandhi Centre for Biotechnology, the rainbow bridge at Kochi marine drive, the Nehru international stadium at Kochi were some of his contributions.

Personal life
Karunakaran was born on 5 July 1918 in Chirakkal near Kannur to Thekkedathu Ravunni Marar and Kannoth Kalyani Amma. He had two elder brothers, Kunjirama Marar and Balakrishna Marar; a younger brother, Damodara Marar (Appunni Marar); and a sister, Devaki, who died when Karunakaran was five years old. His father was a record keeper in the erstwhile Malabar District.

During his childhood, Karunakaran was an expert in swimming, painting, football and volleyball. Though he was named Karunakara Marar, he later dropped his caste title, and came to be known just by his name.

Karunakaran started his school education by joining Vadakara Govt. Lower Primary School in 1923. Later, he studied in Andallur government school and the famous Raja's High School near his home in Chirakkal. After passing matriculation from Raja's High School, he went to Thrissur and joined Govt. Fine Arts' college, from where he took degrees in painting and mathematics. For treating an eye disorder, he went to his maternal uncle's home in Vellanikkara near Thrissur, along with his elder brother Kunjirama Marar. Later, he married his maternal uncle's daughter Kalyanikkutty Amma in 1954 at Guruvayoor Temple, when he was 36 and Kalyanikkutty Amma was 30. K. Muraleedharan and Padmaja Venugopal, famous Congress politicians, are their children.

On 3 June 1992, during his last stint as Chief Minister, he had met with a near fatal car accident on his way to Thiruvananthapuram. It was after a prolonged treatment in both India and U.S.A. that he survived. In the next year, Kalyanikkutty Amma died following a heart ailment.

Political life

In 1937, Karunakaran joined the flood relief camps that were conducted by V. R. Krishnan Ezhuthachan, C. Achutha Menon, R.M. Manakkalath and other leaders of Prajamandalam, an early freedom struggle movement in Cochin State. He became a member of the Indian National Congress and began to wear Khadi. He also participated intensively in the trade union activities in the vast Thattil rubber estates where his uncle Raghavan Nair was a 'writer'. During this time, he would spare his artistic skills and labour in helping the workers' union (later INTUC) for their wall writings and campaigns. Gradually, he was picked up by Panampilly Govinda Menon as his most favourite follower. In due course, Karunakaran rose to a level of the senior-most Leader of the Indian National Trade Union Congress (INTUC). The INTUC later became one of the largest trade unions in India having with over 4 million memberships today. He went on to become the Thrissur District Congress Committee President, after which he was elected to the Cochin Legislative Assembly twice before the formation of Kerala State. He contested in the 1957 Kerala Legislative Assembly Elections against a strong trade unionist and an ex. congressmen, DR.A R Menon, when no one in the state Congress party came up front to oppose Mr. Menon. When the results came, Karunakaran lost by less than one thousand votes.

 

The VIP pavilion in the Jawaharlal Nehru Stadium in Kaloor, Kochi is named after him in his honour.

In 1977, following The National Emergency (India) when Congress governments lost elections across the nation, Karunakaran led congress to a thumping victory securing 111 in 1977 Kerala Legislative Assembly elections. However, he had to resign after one month following the controversies that emerged about Rajan case. But he emerged into center stage as a strong supporter of Indira Gandhi after emergency.

The political downfall of K. Karunakaran commenced with an accident that happened to him 1992 June. After the accident K. Karunakaran was hospitalized in Sree Chitra Tirunal Institute for Medical Sciences and Technology, Trivandrum and there was a period of crisis within the finances and administration of the state government following this. This grew into a political crisis when the affairs of state government was managed by a Kitchen Cabinet of K. Muraleedharan son of K.Karunakaran and K. Padmakumar I.A.S., Chief Secretary and trusted aide of Karunakaran. This situation embroiled a crisis within the state Congress as then Finance Minister and second in command of ruling front, Oommen Chandy belonging to the pro- Antony faction within the party was not given the charge. By 1993, Karunakaran recovered and became active in the affairs, during this period, the discontent generated earlier was further aggravated by bringing K. M. Mani into the foray when a split occurred in Kerala Congress and Kerala Congress (Jacob) was formed. During this same period a correctionist(thiruthalvadi) group emerged within Karunakaran faction led by G. Karthikeyan, Ramesh Chennithala and M. I. Shanavas against the authoritarian tendency of Karunakaran and proxy rule by his son Muraleedharan. The situation intensified into an inner party revolt when M.A, Kuttappan mooted by state Congress as Rajya Sabha nominee was denied candidature due to instruction from high command where Karunakaran had considerable influence. The difference of opinion that emerged between Oommen Chandy and Karunakaran became public and vociferous with Chandy threatening to resign and giving speeches against Karunakaran. By the fag end of 1994, the ISRO espionage case emerged and the case assumed a political fervor when Kerala High Court made remarks against then Inspector General of Kerala Police Raman Srivastava IPS who was close with Karunakaran. Thereafter the dissidence within party grew into a full scale crisis where Antony faction was in verge of withdrawing support to the government and then G. K. Moopanar arrived on behalf of P. V. Narasimha Rao and insisted Karunakaran to resign. At that time, Karunakaran was all for shielding Nambi Narayanan and argued that no action should be taken against a top scientist without a detailed probe. Later ISRO case was proved baseless however after stepping down from the Chief ministership of Kerala in 1995, Karunakaran could never rise up to higher ranks in successive governments or within the party ever.Democratic Indira Congress (Karunakaran) founded at a meeting in Thrissur by the Karunakuran faction of the Indian National Congress on 1 May 2005. Initially it was called National Congress (Indira), but the name was changed DIC(K) for registration purposes in August of the same year.He rejoined on Congress in 11 December 2007.

Death
Karunakaran died on 23 December 2010, aged 92, at Ananthapuri Hospital in Thiruvananthapuram. He had had respiratory problems, fever and other age related diseases and had been hospitalized since 21 October 2010. His condition worsened following a stroke and died following a cardiac arrest, as declared by doctors at 5:30 PM. It was coincidental that his death and Narasimha Rao's death was on same date, Rao had died six years earlier in 2004. Karunakaran had played key role in backing the Rao Government and later Rao had dismissed Karunakaran from the chair of Chief Minister of Kerala. His funeral was attended by the then prime minister Manmohan Singh and the AICC chief Sonia Gandhi. He was cremated with full state honors at his residence in Punkunnam Thrissur.

Biographies
The first biography on him titled K.Karunakaran was written by Vrindavanam Venugopalan. Published by Islamiya Books, Aluva in 1992.

Controversies

K. Karunakaran was the home minister of Kerala during the emergency period and decimated the Naxalite–Maoist insurgency in Kerala. After the Emergency, the Rajan case rocked Kerala politics and Karunakaran was forced to step down as the case attracted national attention. A habeas corpus petition was filed by T.V. Eachara Warrier asking the state machinery to produce his son Rajan (a student of Regional Engineering College, Calicut), who actively participated in protests against the emergency declared by the Indira government) in court. Rajan was allegedly killed by the police at Kakkayam police torture camp and the body disposed of. The legal battle led by Rajan's father became one of the most remembered human rights fights in the state and diminished Karunakaran's popularity.

Karunakaran was an accused in the Palmolein Oil Import Scam, which was pending before the Supreme Court at the time of his death.. The Central Vigilance Commission (CVC) who finally investigated the case mentioned in 2013 that no case can be made against the officials and that there was no loss to the State Government. The case was finally withdrawn. 

He was forced to resign due to the allegations about involvement of a senior Indian Police Service officer under him named  Raman Srivastava in ISRO Espionage Scandal.

See also
 Chief Ministers of Kerala
 Kerala Ministers
 Democratic Indira Congress (Karunakaran)

References

 The Hindu on Karunakaran
 News of Death of Karunakaran
 facebook page of Karunakaran

Further reading
 

1918 births
2010 deaths
Chief Ministers of Kerala
Nationalist Congress Party politicians from Kerala
Malayali politicians
Kerala politicians
Politicians from Kannur
Politicians from Thrissur
Indian independence activists from Kerala
Indian National Congress politicians from Kerala
India MPs 1999–2004
India MPs 1998–1999
Lok Sabha members from Kerala
Rajya Sabha members from Kerala
Leaders of the Opposition in Kerala
Chief ministers from Indian National Congress
Kerala MLAs 1967–1970
Kerala MLAs 1970–1977
Kerala MLAs 1977–1979
Kerala MLAs 1980–1982
Kerala MLAs 1982–1987
Kerala MLAs 1987–1991
Kerala MLAs 1991–1996
Members of the Travancore–Cochin Legislative Assembly
Commerce and Industry Ministers of India